Light in the Window (also known as Light in the Window: The Art of Vermeer) is a 1952 short film directed by Jean Oser. It won an Oscar in 1953 for Best Short Subject (One-Reel).

References

External links 

1952 films
1952 short films
American black-and-white films
Live Action Short Film Academy Award winners
1950s English-language films